NDIC can refer to:
National Defense Intelligence College, a United States intelligence education facility formerly known as the Joint Military Intelligence College
National Drug Intelligence Center, a United States Department of Justice institution
Notre Dame-Immaculate Conception School, a private, Catholic elementary school located in Easthampton, Massachusetts
National Defence Industries Council, the most senior forum for consultation between the Government of the United Kingdom and industry on defence matters
Nigeria Deposit Insurance Corporation, an independent agency of the Federal Government of Nigeria